Askøy Fotballklubb is a Norwegian football club from Kleppestø in Askøy municipality, founded on 3 March 1999 as a merger between Florvåg IF and Kleppestø FK.

The men's team currently plays in the Fifth Division, the sixth tier of Norwegian football, after last playing in the Third Division in 2011. The club played in the Second Division in 2006 and 2007, having previously played in the Third Division since the club was formed.

The women's team plays in the lower divisions.

Recent history, men's team
{|class="wikitable"
|-bgcolor="#efefef"
! Season
!
! Pos.
! Pl.
! W
! D
! L
! GS
! GA
! P
!Cup
!Notes
|-
|2001
|3. Division, section 15
|align=right bgcolor=silver|2
|align=right|22||align=right|15||align=right|2||align=right|5
|align=right|81||align=right|42||align=right|47
|
|
|-
|2002
|3. Division, section 15
|align=right bgcolor=silver|2
|align=right|22||align=right|14||align=right|4||align=right|4
|align=right|70||align=right|41||align=right|46
|
|
|-
|2003
|3. Division, section 14
|align=right bgcolor=bronze|3
|align=right|22||align=right|11||align=right|6||align=right|5
|align=right|70||align=right|43||align=right|39
|1st qualifying round
|
|-
|2004
|3. Division, section 15
|align=right bgcolor=silver|2
|align=right|22||align=right|12||align=right|5||align=right|5
|align=right|67||align=right|43||align=right|41
|1st round
|
|-
|2005
|3. Division, section 14
|align=right bgcolor=gold|1
|align=right|22||align=right|17||4||align=right|1
|align=right|79||align=right|11||align=right|55
|1st round
|Promoted to 2. Division
|-
|2006
|2. Division, section 3
|align=right |11
|align=right|26||align=right|8||align=right|3||align=right|15
|align=right|36||align=right|62||align=right|27
|2nd round
|
|-
|2007
||2. Division, section 3
|align=right bgcolor=red|13
|align=right|26||align=right|8||align=right|0||align=right|18
|align=right|40||align=right|84||align=right|24
|2nd round
|Relegated to 3. Division
|-
|2008
|3. Division, section Hordaland 2
|align=right |7
|align=right|22||align=right|8||align=right|4||align=right|10
|align=right|49||align=right|51||align=right|28
|2nd qualifying round
|
|-
|2009
|3. Division, section Hordaland 1
|align=right |5
|align=right|22||align=right|10||align=right|4||align=right|8
|align=right|61||align=right|56||align=right|34
|1st qualifying round
|
|-
|2010
|3. Division, section Hordaland 1
|align=right |6
|align=right|22||align=right|10||align=right|3||align=right|9
|align=right|49||align=right|52||align=right|33
|1st qualifying round
|
|-
|2011
|3. Division, section 7
|align=right bgcolor=red|13
|align=right|26||align=right|5||align=right|3||align=right|18
|align=right|40||align=right|89||align=right|18
|2nd qualifying round
|Relegated to 4. Division
|-
|2012
|4. Division, section Hordaland 1
|align=right|10
|align=right|24||align=right|9||align=right|3||align=right|12
|align=right|35||align=right|40||align=right|30
|1st qualifying round
|
|-
|2013
|4. Division, section Hordaland 1
|||||||||||||||
|
|
|}

References

External links
 Official site
 Club history

Football clubs in Norway
Association football clubs established in 1999
Sport in Hordaland
Askøy
1999 establishments in Norway